The Confederation of Cologne was a medieval military alliance against Denmark signed 1367 by cities of the Hanseatic League on their meeting called Hansetag in Cologne.

The Hanseatic cities at the southern coast of the Baltic sea had nearly lost the First Danish-Hanseatic War in the Battle of Helsingborg (1362) and made a peace with Denmark at Vordingborg (1365). Since this peace was not enforceable the cities of Lübeck, Rostock, Stralsund, Wismar, Kulm, Thorn, Elbing, Kampen, Harderwyk, Elburg, Amsterdam and Briel signed the confederatio for war against Danmark and Norway. So the confederation had as members some non-hanseatic Dutch cities too. The treaty was signed for the duration of the war planned plus another three years. The original language of the treaty is not Latin but the cities' lingua franca, Middle Low German. The Second Danish-Hanseatic War ended with the Treaty of Stralsund (1370) and was a major success for the league. The Confederation of Cologne lasted with several prolongations until 1385. The Treaty regulated the financial aspects of the war and how many ships and crew the participating seagoing cities had to send.

References
 Dollinger, Philippe (1999). The German Hansa. Routledge. .

External links
original wording of the treaty

Hanseatic League
Cologne
Warfare of the Middle Ages
History of Cologne
1367 in Europe
14th century in Denmark
14th-century military alliances